Devendra Satpathy was an Indian politician. In the 1971 election he was elected to the Lok Sabha from Dhenkanal in Odisha. He was a student of Christ College in Cuttack.

References

External links
 Official biographical sketch in Parliament of India website

 SNSMT

1929 births
1990 deaths
India MPs 1971–1977
India MPs 1977–1979
Lok Sabha members from Odisha
Bharatiya Lok Dal politicians
Janata Party politicians
Indian National Congress politicians from Odisha